The Holocaust in France was the persecution, deportation, and annihilation of Jews and Roma between 1940 and 1944 in occupied France, metropolitan Vichy France, and in Vichy-controlled French North Africa, during World War II. The persecution began in 1940, and culminated in deportations of Jews from France to Nazi concentration camps in Nazi Germany and Nazi-occupied Poland. The deportation started in 1942 and lasted until July 1944. Of the 340,000 Jews living in metropolitan/continental France in 1940, more than 75,000 were deported to death camps, where about 72,500 were murdered.

Anti-semitism was prevalent to at least some extent throughout Europe at the time. As in other German-occupied and aligned states, the Nazis in France relied to a considerable extent on the co-operation of local authorities to carry out what they called the Final Solution. The government of Vichy France and the French police organized and implemented the roundups of Jews. Although the vast majority of the deported Jews were killed, the overall survival rate of the Jewish population in France was up to 75%, which is one of the highest survival rates in Europe.

Background
In the summer of 1940, around 700,000 Jews lived in French-ruled territory, of which 400,000 lived in French Algeria, then an integral part of France, and in the two French protectorates of Tunisia and Morocco. On the eve of World War II, Metropolitan France had a population of over 300,000 Jews, around 200,000 of whom lived in Paris. France also hosted a large population of foreign Jews who had fled persecutions in Germany. By 1939, the Jewish population had increased to 330,000 due in part to the refusal of the United States and the United Kingdom to accept any more Jewish refugees following the Évian Conference. After the German occupation of Belgium and the Netherlands in 1940, Metropolitan France received a new wave of Jewish immigrants and its Jewish population peaked at 340,000 individuals.

At the declaration of World War II, French Jews were mobilized into the French military like all their compatriots, and as in 1914, a significant number of foreign Jews enlisted in regiments of foreign volunteers. Jewish refugees from Germany were interned as enemy aliens together with other German citizens. In general, the Jewish population of France was confident in the ability of France to defend them against the occupiers, but some, particularly from Alsace and the Moselle regions, fled westwards into the unoccupied zone from July 1940.

The armistice of 22 June 1940, signed between the Third Reich and the government of Marshal Philippe Pétain, did not contain any overtly anti-Jewish clauses, but it did indicate that the Germans intended the racial order existent in Germany since 1935 to spread to Metropolitan France and its overseas territories:
 Article 3 warned that in the regions of France occupied directly by the Germans, the French administration must "by all means facilitate the regulations" relating to the exercise of the rights of the Reich;
 Articles 16 and 19 warned that the French government had to proceed to repatriate refugees from the occupied territory and that "The French government is required to deliver on demand all German nationals designated by the Reich and who are in France, in French possessions, colonies, protectorates and territories under mandate."

Under the terms of the armistice, only part of Metropolitan France was occupied by Germany. From the city of Vichy, the government of Marshal Pétain nominally ruled Vichy France, the name of France of Vichy Under the Occupation (la France de Vichy), a new French State (l'État français), but only governed the southern part of metropolitan France, the three departments of French Algeria, and the French empire (France d'outre-mer), France's overseas territories such as the two French protectorates of Morocco and Tunisia, Indochina, the Levant, etc. Nazi Germany and the Vichy regime saw the French empire as an integral part of non-occupied Vichy France, and its anti-Jewish decrees were immediately implemented there, because of the Vichy vision of the empire as a territorial continuation of metropolitan France

History

Conditions of armistice

From the summer of 1940, Otto Abetz, the German ambassador in Paris, organized the expropriation of rich Jewish families. The Vichy regime took the first anti-Jewish measures slightly after the German authorities in the autumn of 1940. On 3 October 1940, Vichy passed the Law on the status of Jews to define who was a Jew, and to issue a list of occupations prohibited to Jews. Article 9 of the law stated that it applied to France's possessions of French Algeria, the colonies, the Protectorates of Tunisia and Morocco, and mandates territories. The October 1940 law was prepared by Raphaël Alibert. A 2010 document makes it clear that Pétain personally made the law even more aggressively antisemitic than it initially was, as can be seen by annotations made on the draft in his own hand. The law "embraced the definition of a Jew established in the Nuremberg Laws", deprived the Jews of their civil rights, and fired them from many jobs. The law also forbade Jews from working in certain professions (teachers, journalists, lawyers, etc.) while the law of 4 October 1940 provided authority for the incarceration of foreign Jews in internment camps in southern France such as Gurs. These internees were joined by convoys of Jews deported from regions of France, including 6,500 Jews who had been deported from Alsace-Lorraine during Operation Bürckel.

During Operation Bürckel, Gauleiters Josef Bürckel and Robert Heinrich Wagner oversaw the expulsion of Jews into unoccupied France from their Gaues and the parts of Alsace-Lorraine that had been annexed in the summer of 1941 to the Reich. Only those Jews in mixed marriages were not expelled. The 6,500 Jews affected by Operation Bürckel were given at most two hours warning on the night of 22–23 October 1940, before being rounded up. The nine trains carrying the deported Jews crossed over into France "without any warning to the French authorities", who were not happy with receiving them. The deportees had not been allowed to take any of their possessions with them, these being confiscated by the German authorities. The German Foreign Minister Joachim von Ribbentrop treated the ensuing complaints by the Vichy government over the expulsions in a "most dilatory fashion". As a result, the Jews expelled in Operation Bürckel were interned in harsh conditions by the Vichy authorities at the camps in Gurs, Rivesaltes and Les Milles while awaiting a chance to return them to Germany.

The General Commissariat for Jewish Affairs, created by the Vichy State in March 1941, supervised the seizure of Jewish assets and organized anti-Jewish propaganda. At the same time, the Germans began compiling registers of Jews in the occupied zone. The Second Statut des Juifs of 2 June 1941 systematized this registration across the country and in Vichy-North Africa. Because the yellow star-of-David badge was not made compulsory in the unoccupied zone, these records would provide the basis for the future round-ups and deportations. In the occupied zone, a German order enforced the wearing of the yellow star for all Jews aged over 6 on 29 May 1942.

On 2 October 1941, seven synagogues were bombed in Paris. Still, the vast majority of synagogues remained opened during the whole war in the Zone libre. The Vichy government even protected them after attacks as a way to deny persecution. In Alsace-Lorraine, many synagogues were destroyed or converted.

In order to more closely control the Jewish community, on 29 November 1941, the Germans created the Union générale des israélites de France (UGIF) in which all Jewish charitable works were subsumed. The Germans were thus able to learn where the local Jews lived. Many of the leaders of the UGIF was also deported, such as René-Raoul Lambert and André Baur.

Drancy camp

The arrests of Jews in France began in 1940 for individuals, and general round ups began in 1941. The first raid (rafle) took place on 14 May 1941. The Jews arrested, all men and foreigners, were interned in the first transit camps at Pithiviers and Beaune-la-Rolande in the Loiret (3,747 men). The second round-up, between 20 July and 1 August 1941, led to the arrest of 4,232 French and foreign Jews who were taken to Drancy internment camp.

Deportations began on 27 March 1942, when the first convoy left Paris for Auschwitz. Women and children were also targeted, for instance during the Vel' d'Hiv Roundup on 16–17 July 1942, in which 13,000 Jews were arrested by the French police. In the occupied zone, the French police were effectively controlled by the German authorities. They carried out the measures ordered by the Germans against Jews, and in 1942, delivered non-French Jews from internment camps to the Germans. They also contributed to the sending of tens of thousands from those camps to extermination camps in German-occupied Poland, via Drancy.

At the time, it was announced that the Reich had created a homeland for Jews somewhere in Eastern Europe, to which all of the Jews of Europe would be "resettled", and was portrayed as a utopia. In the spring of 1942, the claim that "resettlment in the East" meant going to the mysterious Jewish homeland in Eastern Europe was widely believed in France, even by most Jews, and though most French people did not believe the supposed homeland was really the paradise that the Nazis had promised, few could imagine the truth.

In the unoccupied zone, from August 1942, foreign Jews who had been deported to refugee camps in south-west France, in Gurs, Récébédou, and elsewhere, were again arrested and deported to the occupied zone, from where they were sent to extermination camps in Germany and occupied Poland.

From the invasion of the Zone libre to 1945
In late summer 1942, Adam Rayski, the editor of the Communist underground newspaper J'accuse,  came into contact with a former soldier in the Spanish Republican Army who had fled to France in 1939. The soldier had in turn been deported from the Gurs internment camp to work as a slave laborer on a project run by the Organisation Todt in Poland before escaping back to France. The soldier told Rayski that he learned during his time in Poland that there was a camp located in Silesia named Auschwitz where all of the Jews been sent for "resettlement in the East" were being exterminated. After much doubt and debate with the other journalists of J'accuse, Rasyki wrote a cover story on 10 October 1942 edition of J'accuse stating that about 11,000 French Jews had been exterminated at Auschwitz since March 1942.

In November 1942, the whole of France came under direct German control, apart from a small sector occupied by Italy. In the Italian zone, Jews were generally spared persecution, until the fall of the Fascist regime in Italy led to the establishment of the German-controlled Italian Social Republic in northern Italy in September 1943.

The German authorities took increasingly direct charge of the persecution of Jews, while public opinion forced the Vichy authorities towards a more sensitive approach. However, the Milice, a French paramilitary force inspired by Nazi ideology, was heavily involved in rounding up Jews for deportation during this period. The frequency of German convoys increased. The last, from the camp at Drancy, left the Gare de Bobigny on 31 July 1944, just one month before the Liberation of Paris.

In French Algeria, General Henri Giraud and later Charles de Gaulle, the French exile government restored (de jure) French citizenship to Jews on 20 October 1943.

Aftermath
About 75,000 Jews were deported to Nazi concentration camps and death camps and 72,500 of them were murdered, but 75% of the approximately 330,000 Jews in metropolitan France in 1939 escaped deportation and survived the Holocaust, which is one of the highest survival rates in Europe. France has the third highest number of citizens who were awarded the Righteous Among the Nations, an award given to "non-Jews who acted according to the most noble principles of humanity by risking their lives to save Jews during the Holocaust".

Government admission
For decades, the French government declined to apologize for the role of the French police in the roundup or for other state complicity. Its argument was that Philippe Pétain dismantled the French Republic when he instituted a new French State during the war and that the Republic had been re-established when the war was over. It was not for the Republic, therefore, to apologise for events that happened while it did not exist and which had been carried out by an illegitimate state which it did not recognise. Former President François Mitterrand, for example, maintained this position. The claim was much more recently reiterated during the 2017 presidential election campaign by Marine Le Pen, leader of the extreme righ National Front Party.

The subject of the "Final Solution" was therefore ignored for decades. The narrative, promoted by de Gaulle starting in 1944, that almost the entire French nation had been united in resisting the occupation with the exception of a few dishonorable traitors made it difficult to acknowledge the role of French civil servants, policemen and gendarmes in the "Final Solution". The first book to mention the subject at any length was Vichy France: Old Guard and New Order, 1940-1944 (1972) by the American historian Robert Paxton, through the focus in his book was Vichy France in general. The first book dedicated entirely to the subject was Vichy France and the Jews (1981), which was co-written by Paxton and the Canadian historian Michael Marrus.   
 
On 16 July 1995, President Jacques Chirac stated that it was time that France faced up to its past and he acknowledged the role that the state had played in the persecution of Jews and other victims of the German occupation. Those responsible for the roundup, according to Chirac, were "4,500 policemen and gendarmes, French, under the authority of their leaders [who] obeyed the demands of the Nazis." Chirac commented in his speech about the Velodrome d'Hiver roundup: "[T]hose black hours soiled our history forever. ... [T]he criminal madness of the occupier was assisted by the French people, by the French State. ... France, that day, committed the irreparable."

To mark the 70th anniversary of the roundup, President François Hollande gave a speech at a monument to the Vel' d'Hiv Roundup on 22 July 2012. The president recognized that this event was a crime committed "in France, by France," and emphasized that the deportations in which French police participated were offenses committed against French values, principles, and ideals. He continued his speech by remarking on French tolerance towards others.

In July 2017, also in commemoration of the victims of the roundup at the Vélodrome d'Hiver, President Emmanuel Macron denounced his country's role in the Holocaust and the historical revisionism that denied France's responsibility for 1942 roundup and subsequent deportation of 13,000 Jews. "It was indeed France that organised this [roundup]", he said, French police collaborating with the Nazis. "Not a single German took part," he added. Neither Chirac nor Hollande had specifically stated that the Vichy government, in power during WW II, actually represented the French State. Macron on the other hand, made it clear  that the Government during the War was indeed the French State. "It is convenient to see the Vichy regime as born of nothingness, returned to nothingness. Yes, it's convenient, but it is false. We cannot build pride upon a lie."

Macron did make a subtle reference to Chirac's 1995 apology when he added, "I say it again here. It was indeed France that organized the roundup, the deportation, and thus, for almost all, death."

See also

 Children of Izieu
 Tulle massacre
 Vichy Holocaust collaboration timeline

References

Bibliography
 
 
 
 
 
 
 
 .

Further reading
 Adler, Jacques. "The Jews and Vichy: reflections on French historiography." Historical Journal 44.4 (2001): 1065–82.

External links

 France at the European Holocaust Research Infrastructure (EHRI)
 France at the United States Holocaust Memorial Museum (USHMM)
 The Holocaust in France – at Yad Vashem website
 The Holocaust in France – a Yad Vashem newsletter
 Children's homes in France during the Holocaust – an online exhibition at Yad Vashem website

 
1940 establishments in France
1944 disestablishments in France
France
Antisemitism in France